The crash of Delta Air Lines Flight 318 was an accident involving a Douglas DC-3 of the American airline Delta Air Lines 21 km (13 miles) East of Marshall, Texas, United States on 17 May 1953, killing all but one of the 20 people on board.

Crew 
Flight 318 was under the command of Captain Douglas B. Yolk, who had a total of 7,120 hours of flight experience, all of which on the Douglas DC-3. The plane's First Officer was James P. Stewart, who had 2,114 hours of total flight experience, including 803 hours on the DC-3. The final crew member consisted of Flight attendant Joanne Carlson.

Accident 
Delta Air Lines Flight 318 took off from Dallas Love Field in Dallas, Texas, United States at 1.10 pm on 17 May 1953 on a scheduled flight to Atlanta, Georgia, United States with a stopover at Shreveport Regional Airport in Shreveport, Louisiana, United States carrying 3 crew and 17 passengers. While on route, the pilots were warned by ATC about possible thunderstorms on their flight route. At 2.12 pm, Flight 318 was cleared by the Shreveport Control Tower to make a hard right turn on approach to runway 13. Flight 138 confirmed the message and requested on update on the weather conditions at Shreveport. Flight 318's crew acknowledged the message, however the crew never altered the plane's course to avoid the thunderstorm.

A strong downdraft eventually forced the plane to the ground, where it ended up hitting the tree tops at a shallow angle of descent. The plane continued on, cutting through the trees for another 152 m (500 feet) during which the aircraft struck the ground, skidding for another 112 m (370 feet) before the aircraft finally came to a stop and partially burned out. When ATC radioed Flight 318 for a position update at 2.16 pm, they received no reply. Further attempts to contact the flight also proved unsuccessful, when at 2.28 pm, ATC was informed that Flight 318 had crashed near Marshall, Texas. All three crew members were killed in the crash alongside 16 of the 17 passengers on board. The sole survivor suffered serious injuries.

Aircraft 
The Douglas DC-3 involved, registered N28345 (msn 2224) was built in 1940 and had accumulated 39,000 flight hours during her 13 year long service. The aircraft was in use of Delta Air Lines during its last flight on 17 May 1953.

Aftermath 
The aircraft was destroyed in the accident, while all but one of the 20 occupants of the flight were killed. An investigation of the accident revealed that the aircraft had been forced to the ground by a sudden downdraft which was caused by the thunderstorm it was flying in at the time, resulting in the loss of control over the aircraft and subsequent crash. A contributing factor to the crash was the captain's decision to go into the storm rather than to avoid it as it was adhered by the company's directives.

References 

Delta Air Lines accidents and incidents
Airliner accidents and incidents caused by weather
1953 in the United States
Aviation accidents and incidents in 1953
Accidents and incidents involving the Douglas DC-3
Aviation accidents and incidents in the United States in 1953
Aviation accidents and incidents in Texas
Aviation accidents and incidents caused by loss of control
Airliner accidents and incidents caused by microbursts
May 1953 events
May 1953 events in North America